Hérouville-Saint-Clair is a commune in the Calvados department in the Normandy region in northwestern France.

It is a suburb of the city of Caen, and lies adjacent to it in a northeasterly direction, along the west side of the Canal de Caen à la Mer. Its inhabitants are called Hérouvillais.

Just across the canal from Hérouville is a Renault Trucks manufacturing plant, which is situated between the canal and the Orne River. Just east of the river is the town of Colombelles.

Hérouville was the commune name until 1957.

Population
Hérouville-Saint-Clair experienced a very fast development which made it the most populous suburb of Caen. A simple village at the beginning of 1960, the commune passed from fewer than 2,000 inhabitants to almost 25,000 in less than fifteen years. This figure has varied little since 1975.

See also
Communes of the Calvados department

References

External links

 Official website

Communes of Calvados (department)
Calvados communes articles needing translation from French Wikipedia